In the compound eye of invertebrates such as insects and crustaceans, the  pseudopupil appears as a dark spot which moves across the eye as the animal is rotated. This occurs because the ommatidia that one observes "head-on" (along their optical axes) absorb the incident light, while those to one side reflect it. The pseudopupil therefore reveals which ommatidia are aligned with the axis along which the observer is viewing.

Pseudopupil analysis technique 
The pseudopupil analysis technique is used to study neurodegeneration in insects like Drosophila. An adult Drosophila eye consists of nearly 800 unit ommatidia which are repeated in a symmetrical pattern. Each ommatidium contains 8 photoreceptor cells each of which forms a rhabdomere (7 and 8 rhabdomere are overlapping therefore, only 7 are visible at any given plain focus). Neurodegeneration leads to loss or degradation of photoreceptors. By visualizing and counting the intact rhabdomeres, degradation level can be measured. Thus, analyzing the pseudopupil can permit empirical study of neurodegeneration.

References

Eye
Arthropod anatomy